Tooby is a surname. Notable people with the surname include:

John Tooby (born 1952), American anthropologist
Michael Tooby (born 1956), Welsh researcher and curator
Angela Tooby (born 1960), British Olympic athlete
Susan Tooby (born 1960), British Olympic marathon runner and twin of Angela